The Sterling Hardware Building is an historic structure located at 530 6th Avenue in San Diego's Gaslamp Quarter, in the U.S. state of California. It was built in 1887.

See also
 List of Gaslamp Quarter historic buildings

External links

 

1887 establishments in California
Buildings and structures in San Diego
Commercial buildings completed in 1887
Gaslamp Quarter, San Diego